Glipa textilis is a species of beetle in the genus Glipa. It was described in 1855.

References

textilis
Beetles described in 1855